The Yorkshire Wolds Railway is a preserved railway in the East Riding of Yorkshire, England. It is located on a section of the Malton and Driffield Junction Railway near the village of Fimber. The railway has a short demonstration line and an operational industrial diesel locomotive that provides cab rides to visitors. The railway has plans for expansion, work on which has been underway since April 2019.

History

The line was built as part of a scheme supported by George Hudson to create a line of communication from Hull to Newcastle. The line opened in 1853; its traffic was almost exclusively local passenger trains and freight traffic from the quarries at Burdale and Wharram, with the occasional summer Sunday services to the coast. The quarries, however, suffered a boom and bust existence and their business dried up by the 1950s leading to the line's final closure on 20 October 1958.

Heritage operation

In October 2008 the Yorkshire Wolds Railway Restoration Project was formed with the aim to restore at least part of the Malton and Driffield railway line as a heritage attraction under the name Yorkshire Wolds Railway.

In 2012 the group gained planning permission to build a visitors centre near to the site of the former Fimber and Sledmere station. The land required for all of the current project is owned by the Sledmere Estate who are supportive of the railway. As a tourist attraction, the railway is intended to be an interesting stop-off on the route to the Yorkshire coast, becoming part of a range of tourist attractions in the Yorkshire Wolds including Sledmere House and Wharram Percy deserted medieval village.

In September 2012 the project acquired its first vehicle, an ex Mark 1 coach Brake Gangwayed. In 2013 the charity obtained its first locomotive, a GEC diesel shunter GECT5576 built in 1979 at the English Electric Vulcan foundry works. It was originally operated by British Steel Corporation at Shotton, and later by Trackwork Ltd of Doncaster as a training vehicle in the rail engineering unit at HM Prison Lindholme. The locomotive was repainted in BR green, similar to that seen on Class 55 Deltics, and was named Sir Tatton Sykes. In 2018 the railway acquired another piece of rolling stock: BR 20T Brake Van B955043. The brake van arrived on site via low loader in September in the same year. As of 20 October 2020, the brake van is being restored and has been painted BR freight grey; it is partway through being re-roofed.

The Yorkshire Wolds Railway first opened to the public on 24 May 2015, with the official opening by Sir Tatton Sykes on 25 May 2015.

The Yorkshire Wolds Railway is the only heritage railway in the East Riding of Yorkshire.

Extension 
The railway has plans to extend its operational length to 2 miles; this would involve running between the Fimber Halt site, opened when the project commenced, and the original Wetwang railway station. The railway has also had success bidding for funding from the East Riding of Yorkshire Council's LEADER programme and has received donations of track from local industrial railways including Drax Power Station. 

Planning consent was granted on 17 May 2012 for the laying of 0.9 miles (72 chains) of track from Fimber Halt to the edge of a field. Further tracklaying would immediately involve crossing a green lane. A platform at Fimber Halt has been built which allows for easier boarding of trains, particularly when the brake van is ready for use.

Rolling stock 
 GEC  No. 5576 Sir Tatton Sykes (operational)
 Fowler  No. 4240017 Patricia (under restoration)
 BR Mk 1 BG No. 92990 (static use)
 BR 20T Standard Brake Van B955043 (under restoration).
 BR Mk 2 TSO No. 6027 (under restoration)

See also
 Malton and Driffield Junction Railway
 Sledmere and Fimber railway station
 Wetwang railway station

References

Sources

External links 
 Yorkshire Wolds Railway

Heritage railways in Yorkshire
Tourist attractions in the East Riding of Yorkshire
Rail transport in the East Riding of Yorkshire
Malton and Driffield Junction Railway